The Ras Koh Hills is a range of granite hills forming a southwestern part of the Sulaiman Mountain Range, in the Chagai and Kharan districts of Pakistan's Balochistan province. The word "Ras" means "gateway" and the word "Koh" means "mountain" in Balochi. Ras Koh, therefore, means "Gateway to the Mountains." Pakistan's first nuclear tests were carried out in the Ras Koh Hills on 28 May 1998.

Location

The Ras Koh Hills are situated in the Chagai and Kharan districts of Pakistan's Balochistan province and lie to the south of the Chagai Hills, with the higher Sulaiman Mountains to the northeast and the lower Kirthar Mountains to the southeast.

Topography

Plateaus and basins predominate the Ras Koh Hills with an average elevation of 600 metres, but in areas, the hills can reach elevations up to 3,000 metres.  The Ras Koh Hills are composed of granite, are carved out by innumerable channels, but the arid climate restricts rain and for the most part leaves these channels dry.  Although little water reaches the low-lying basins, numerous alluvial fans are found in the area.

A structural depression separates the Chagai Hills and the Ras Koh Hills, consisting of flood plains and areas covered with thin layers of salt.

Unlike the Toba Kakar Range to the north-east, which has scattered juniper, tamarisk and pistachio trees, the Ras Koh Hills are largely barren and devoid of vegetation. Most of people in the area, therefore, lead a nomadic life, raising camels, sheep and goats.

Climate

The Ras Koh Hills lie in an arid zone, which is outside the monsoon belt. The Ras Koh Hills receive scanty and irregular rainfall (an average of 100 mm (4 inches) annually). The temperature is extreme: very hot in summer and very cold in winter. The average minimum temperature is 2.4 °C (36.3 °F) in January and the average maximum temperature is 42.5 °C (108.5 °F) in July.

Wildlife sanctuary
Ras Koh Wildlife Sanctuary covers an area of 994.98 km2. It was designated in 1962 by the Government of Pakistan.

Nuclear tests

Ras Koh Hills was the site of Pakistan's Chagai-I nuclear tests.

References

Hills of Pakistan
Sulaiman Mountains
Chagai District
Kharan District
Landforms of Balochistan (Pakistan)
Pakistani nuclear test sites
Project-706
Nuclear history of Pakistan
Government of Zulfikar Ali Bhutto
Nuclear test sites